Troy Cole (born April 11, 1986 in Laguna Hills, California) is an American soccer player who currently plays for Wilmington Hammerheads.

Career

College
Cole attended Laguna Hills High School in Laguna Hills, California, and played two years of college soccer at Irvine Valley College, scoring three goals and three assists as a defender, before transferring to Mars Hill College after his junior year. He scored 7 goals in 35 games for Mars Hill, and was his team captain as a senior.

During his college years he also played with the Atlanta Blackhawks in the USL Premier Development League.

Professional
Cole signed his first professional contract in 2010 when he was signed by AC St. Louis of the USSF Division 2 Professional League. He made his professional debut starting at right back on April 10, 2010 in a game against the Carolina RailHawks.

After the demise of AC St. Louis, Cole signed with F.C. New York of the USL Pro league on March 15, 2011. He scored his first professional goal while playing for New York, in a 3-0 victory over the Dayton Dutch Lions on June 10, 2011.

Coaching career
Cole worked as an assistant coach for his alma mater, Mars Hill College, in 2009.

References

External links
 AC St. Louis bio
 Atlanta Blackhawks player profile

1986 births
Living people
American soccer players
Atlanta Blackhawks players
AC St. Louis players
F.C. New York players
Wilmington Hammerheads FC players
VSI Tampa Bay FC players
Soccer players from California
USL League Two players
USSF Division 2 Professional League players
Association football defenders
USL Championship players